The Basel Christian Church of Malaysia or BCCM, formerly known as Borneo Basel Self Established Church, is one of the four Lutheran bodies in Malaysia. It currently has 112 congregations nationwide and 63,000 baptised members.

The Borneo Basel Self Established Church was founded in 1925. Though following in the tradition of the Basel Mission, it was an independent institution. After the Second World War, the Chinese segment of the population experienced a period of urbanisation and economic growth. The foundation of the Malaysian state in 1963 was the occasion for the church to change its name to "Basel Christian Church of Malaysia". By the end of the 1960s, the church followed the example of its sister church in Hong Kong and joined the Lutheran World Federation (LWF).

By the end of the 1970s, the BCCM's awareness for its mission among the native population of Sabah grew. The missionary work, which the BCCM began to do independently and in different places in Sabah, led to the establishment of local Malay-speaking congregations. This native branch of BCCM congregations is organised in a separate synod, which is part of the overall synod of the BCCM. Its name is BCCM – Bahasa Malaysia (BCCM-BM); it represents 22,000 congregation members and is mainly present in central and west Sabah. In many places, the dependency on the Chinese-speaking congregations is still considerable and is seen as a burden by the Chinese. The BCCM-BM has six congregation districts with a total of 90 congregations (including Kuala Lumpur).

The current bishop (since 2016) of the Basel Christian Church of Malaysia is Rev. Dr. James Wong Chong Leong and the current president is Mr. Vun Soon Chong.

History

In the beginning, the Basel Missionary Society Mission sent its missionaries to Africa, and later to India in 1833. In 1846, missionaries were also sent to China. The first two missionaries to Mainland China and Hong Kong were Rev. Theodore Hamberg and Rev. Rudolph Lechler. They worked especially among the Hakka linguistic tribe in Guangdong Province and Hong Kong. After many years of labour and hardship, about two hundred congregations and more than one hundred schools were built up. The church membership was about twenty thousand. In the aftermath of the failed Taiping Rebellion in China, Hakka speaking Christians affiliated with the Basel Mission were viewed with suspicion by the Qing government as the leader of the rebellion, Hong Xiuquan, was himself a Hakka who claimed to be a Christian. This resulted in an increase in the number of Hakka-speaking refugees from China into the Southeast Asian region.

The British North Borneo Company established a settlement in North Borneo in December 1882, when an initial group of 100 Hakka Chinese Christian laborers from mainland China landed at Kudat, a town in the northern part of North Borneo. Many groups followed within the next few years. In this new land, the Hakka immigrants worked hard on their land for six days and rested only on Sundays. On Sundays, they gathered in one of their own homes for worship. A large number of them located on the west coast where railway construction had commenced. New towns with a majority of Chinese were set up along the railway line. The Hakka Christians who came along with the other immigrants set up their own worship places on the west coast and other parts of Sabah. Chinese labourers were sought to develop the interior of the territory and the British North Borneo Company sent agents to Hong Kong to recruit these labourers. Rudolph Lechler of the Basel Mission enthusiastically supported the scheme and Hakka Christians from the Basel Mission and the Basel-established Chongzhen Church (Tsung-Tsin Church or 崇真會) were recruited.

The pioneer batch of settlers consisted of ten families who arrived in Kudat and proceeded to found a settlement in Lausan. Worship meetings were held on Sundays in one of the houses until the first attap roofed church building was built in the plantation of Lo Tai Hong in 1886. This became known as the Lausan Church and was the first Basel congregation organised in the territory.

Self-establishment

The Hakka Christians set up their own churches wherever a few families were gathered together. They set up schools as well to educate their children in Chinese. In 1925, during the first synod in Kudat, Rev. Schule, a Basel Mission representative, proposed that the church should immediately practise self-reliance, so that the various gifts in the church could be channelled to administer and develop the church. The church authority felt then that it was not the time yet, but accepted Schule's proposal and became a self-governing, self-supporting, and. self-propagating church.

On 7 July 1937, Japanese militant imperialism exploded an aggressive war with China. In 1941, Japanese advanced to invade South East Asia. In 1941–1945, the people of the state were ravaged and trampled on by the Japanese army. During that time, as many as 70-80 of the church's members were murdered by the Japanese, a few hundred were caused to die. Church buildings were burned, schools bombed, and homes destroyed. Believers were scattered and schools standstill.

In 1945, the Emperor of Japan surrendered unconditionally to the Allied Forces after the atomic bombs were deployed against Japan. But the war had left much devastation and chaos everywhere in the state. The believers had difficulty even in the rehabilitation of their homes, so they could hardly spare themselves for the reconstruction of the mined churches and schools. Fortunately, at that time, the Lutheran World Federation (LWF) was willing to extend a helping hand to aid the church in the forms of finances and manpower such as teachers in the secondary schools. This would become one of the factors that caused the church to join the LWF.

Mission zeal
Active outreach towards the Bumiputra began in 1974, when two members from the congregation at Inanam, Chong Yun Leong and Paul Chung, first launched the campaign of "Preaching the Gospel to the Natives". This ministry was first sponsored by the congregation at Inanam. A sub-committee was formed to plan strategy and raise funds for the mission. In June 1975, Gasin Guntidong, a young Kadazandusun, was engaged to do surveys in the villages. Mission began to reach out to the Kadazandusun living in the Inanam and Menggatal areas. In July 1975, the first Sunday service in Bahasa Malaysia was conducted at the old BCCM Inanam church building with an attendance of 16 people. The outreach was stepped up and many villages such as Kg. Kokol, Kg. Piniang, Kg. Binaung, Kg. Munsing, were reached. In July 1976, the first Bumiputra chapel was built at Kampung Penang. The first baptism service for the Kadazan-Dusuns was held on Ascension Day of 1976 with 76 persons baptized.

The mission among the Bumiputra expanded quickly. It was taken over jointly by the Kota Kinabalu parish and the Central Council. Outreach was not only directed at the Kadazan-Dusuns in the west coast but was extended to the Muruts in Pensiangan District in 1978. The mission to the Muruts began when a Christian brother was on official duty to Pensiangan in 1972. He saw that thousands of Muruts were living and dying without the gospel. They were victims of their social systems and traditions. Their need for the gospel was conveyed to the BCCM Central Mission Committee and a team was sent to survey the possibility of a mission there in April 1978. In 1978, Richard Angang, a half-Murut pastor, was posted to Sapulut with his family. A month later, a young Bible school graduate was sent to join him. By 1993, there were a total of 20 young Bumiputra pastors, and 11,000 Bumiputra members worshipping in 80 churches, chapels, or gathering places since BCCM first began its cross-cultural mission about three decades earlier. As more and more Bumiputra congregations and places of worship were set up, the BCCM felt the constraints of manpower in the field and leadership for the newly established congregations. The BCCM Central Mission Committee felt that it was time to establish a center to provide basic training both in Bible knowledge and leadership for the Bumiputra in Bahasa Malaysia.

Bible Training Centre

In 1980, a Bible Training Center in Kota Kinabalu (Pusat Latihan Alkitab Kota Kinabalu or PLAKK) was set up at the location of the BCCM Kota Kinabalu's old church building on Signal Hill, Old Tuaran Road (located in between the heart of the city center, Karamunsing, Likas, Damai, and Luyang neighbourhoods). Two old buildings of the Lok Yuk Secondary School were converted into classrooms, hostels, a dining hall, and teachers' quarters. In its early stage, the Bible Training Center provided only one year of training with an initial admission of ten students supervised by two full-time teachers, the Rev. Datuk Thomas Tsen and the Rev. Daniel Taie. In 1981, another twelve students joined the program. As the need for better equipped full-time pastoral workers in the Bumiputra congregations continued to grow, the church felt that it was time to further up-grade the Bible Training Center to a full seminary in order to provide a regular program of theological studies toward diploma and bachelor's degrees in theology. The inauguration of Sabah Theological Seminary was proposed and adopted during BCCM's Synod in 1985. Sabah Theological Seminary became the first seminary in Malaysia to use Bahasa Malaysia as the medium of instruction.

Structure and organisation

With the increase in the number of immigrant Hakka settlers from China, other congregations were organised in places and settlements such as Kudat (1901), Papar (1903), Jesselton (1905), Sandakan (1907), Beaufort (1909), Tenom (1911) and Tawau (1913). The Basel Christians also pioneered formal Chinese language education in the territory when the first Chinese school was established in Kudat in 1886.

The first synod of the Basel churches in North Borneo was convened in Kudat in 1925 and following a challenge from the representative of the Basel Mission to become self-reliant, organised themselves as the Borneo Self-Governing Basel Church under the leadership of the Rev. Wong Thien Nyuk. The church was first called the Basel Church. After independence in 1925, it was named the Borneo Basel Self-Established Church. Meanwhile, the Basel Church in Guangdong and Hong Kong adopted a new name, Tsung Tsin Church, in 1924. The church did not follow suit because of its roots and origin. In 1963, Sabah was freed from the British colonial rule, and became a state within the Federation of Malaysia. The church was then renamed The Basel Christian Church of Malaysia and the church officially became a member of the Lutheran World Federation in 1973. As early as the 1950s, the BCCM was involved directly and indirectly in the Basel Mission's cross-cultural mission to the Rungus people in Kudat. In 1967, the BCCM took over the mission work among the tribal people along the Labuk River in Murok, Sandakan. This was a ministry founded by a foreign medical doctor, Dr. G. Christopher Willis. He had to leave Sabah in that year.

Today the BCCM has a total of 39 Chinese congregations, 7 English congregations, and 80 Bahasa Malaysia congregations. Three secondary schools, fourteen primary schools, and more than fourteen kindergartens have been set up in the major towns in Sabah. The BCCM, being a predominantly Hakka Chinese church in the last century, launched its mission to the Bumiputra, primarily the Kadazan-Dusuns on the west coast and the Muruts in the Interior Residency in Sabah in 1975. Since then, BCCM has experienced tremendous growth in its Bumiputra membership. In 2002, the BCCM-BM had around 18,000 church members in six parishes, Paroki Tuaran (15 congregations), Paroki Kota Kinabalu (10 congregations), Paroki Sandakan (12 congregations), Paroki Tawau (3 congregations), Paroki Pedalaman I (13 congregations), Paroki Pedalaman II (7 congregations). Sunway Kuala Lumpur and Kudat are two new congregations established in 2000 and 2001 respectively to cater the needs of church members of BCCM-BM who have migrated and work there respectively. There were 46 full-time pastors serving in BCCM-BM in 2002. In addition, there were four part-time pastors and eight theological students who were studying at the Sabah Theological Seminary.

Beliefs and practices

Mission statement
Jesus says, "You are the light of the world. A city on a hill cannot be hidden. Neither do people light a lamp and put it under a bowl. Instead they put it on its stand, and it gives light to everyone in the house. In the same way, let your light shine before men, that they may see your good deeds and praise your Father in heaven" ( Mat 5: 14–16, NIV). It is our prayer that the BCCM will be the Light not only in Sabah, but also in other parts of the world!

Boat: Historical background
Our ancestors travelled far from China to Sabah and established Basel Church. Though passing through rough seas, with Jesus as the boatman, they got through safely.

Mount Kinabalu: Mission
Under the leadership of the Holy Spirit though the path is difficult, dangerous and with a lot of temptation, all will be overcome and the gospel shall be spread throughout Sabah.

Circle
Unity in the love of the Lord.
All Christians are circled in the love of the Father disregarding race, colour, language and customs. To become perfect person in the Salvation of Christ, spreading the gospel in one accord. The circle also represents the length, breadth, height and depth of the love of God.

Blue
Signifies the long history and the infiniteness, it also represents meekness and peace.

Red
Signifies the fire of the Holy Spirit, full of love, faith, zeal, wisdom, boldly marching forth.

Christian mission schools and kindergartens
Christian mission schools were set up in Sabah by various Christian Missionaries organisations during the late 1800s and the early 1900s. In 1882, the first batch of Chinese (Hakka) Basel Christians arrived at Kudat as laborers recruited by the British North Borneo Chartered Company. Even though the schools were established by the church, they are open to children of all races and religions.

The development of the schools was greatly helped by the Basel Mission in Basel Switzerland and in China, and the Lutheran Church of America providing missionaries, pastors, principals, and teachers, especially after the Second World War, until the early 1970s. To date, the Basel Christian Church of Malaysia has established a total of 29 schools and kindergartens as follows:

Chinese primary schools

 SJK(C) Lok Yuk Likas, Kota Kinabalu
 SJK(C) Lok Yuk Menggatal, Kota Kinabalu
 SJK(C) Anglo Chinese, Papar
 SJK(C) Pinangsoo, Kudat
 SJK(C) Lok Yuk Batu 1, Kudat

Bahasa medium primary schools (formerly English)

 SK Sung Siew, Sandakan;
 SK Lok Yuk Inanam, Kota Kinabalu;
 SK Lok Yuk Likas, Kota Kinabalu;
 SK Lok Yuk Telipok, Kota Kinabalu;
 SK Lok Yuk Batu 1, Kudat
 SK Lok Yuk Tamalang, Kudat
 SK Lok Yuk Sikuati, Kudat

Secondary schools

 SM Lok Yuk (CF) Likas, Kota Kinabalu
 SM Sung Siew (CF), Sandakan
 SM Lok Yuk, Kudat

Kindergartens

 Tadika Lok Yuk, Kota Belud
 Tadika Lok Yuk, Keningau
 Tadika Lok Yuk, Kudat
 Tadika Yuk Yu Inanam, Kota Kinabalu
 Yuk Yu Kindergarten Likas, Kota Kinabalu
 Tadika Lok Yuk Menggatal, Kota Kinabalu
 Tadika Lok Yuk, Papar
 Tadika Yuk Yu Bandar Baru Lido, Penampang
 Tadika Lok Yuk Tamparuli, Tuaran
 Tadika Lok Yuk Petagas, Penampang; 
 Yuk Yu Kindergarten, Ranau
 Sung Siew Kindergarten, Sandakan 
 Wonder Kids Taska Lok Yuk, Tawau
 Tadika Lok Yuk, Tenom

In addition, BCCM Sandakan has established a day-care centre, named Agape Centre, for disabled children, and BCCM Tawau has established a centre for the deaf and Down syndrome children. The first school of BCCM was established in Kudat in 1903. Several schools are more than 100 years old. According to a census report, there were eight mission schools in Sabah (then known as British North Borneo) in 1910, but the number increased to 45 in 1934. Of these, 18 were operated by the Basel Christian Church, 20 by the Roman Catholic Mission, and 7 by the Anglican Church.

Recently, the seven Bahasa medium primary schools and three secondary schools together with 19 other Christian mission schools were presented with cheques of various amounts (based on the schools' application) under the Economy Stimulus Package II, for upgrading of schools, maintenance, and repair. the BCCM Chinese medium primary schools were given similar grants earlier in the year, under the Economy Stimulus Package I.

In the whole of Malaysia, there are around 425 Christian mission schools. On 26–27 June 2009, 41 representatives from Sabah, Sarawak, and Peninsular Malaysia attended the Conference of Christian Mission Schools in Malaysia at Olympic Hotel, Kuala Lumpur, organized by the Malayan Christian Schools Council and the Mission School Authorities of Sabah and Sarawak under the auspices of the Christian Federation of Malaysia (CFM). The representatives were encouraged, affirmed, and united by their common concern in improving their current high standards of education and providing the best opportunities for the children attending these schools.

References

External links

 Basel Christian Church Of Malaysia 馬來西亞基督教巴色会亞庇中文堂 Official Website
 Tsung Tsin Mission of Hong Kong 基督教香港崇真會Chongzhen Church
 Basel Christian Church of Malaysia Kota Kinabalu
 Lutheran Basel Mission
 National Evangelical Christian Fellowship
 Seminary Theological Sabah
 Council of Churches of Malaysia
 The Christian Federation of Malaysia
 Kyrugma House, BCCM KK (English)

Churches in Malaysia
Malaysia
Malaysia
Malaysia
Christian organizations established in 1925
Christian denominations established in the 20th century
Evangelical denominations in Asia